White Sand is a fantasy graphic novel series written by American author Brandon Sanderson and Rik Hoskin, with artwork by Julius Gopez initially and later by Fritz Casas. The first part of the trilogy, White Sand Volume I, was published on June 28, 2016. The second part was published on February 20, 2018. The third and final part was published on September 18, 2019.

Plot
The graphic novels are part of Sanderson's Cosmere arc of inter-connected novels.

The series is set on a desert world, Taldain, where a young Daysider man named Kenton trains to become a Sand Master, harnessing arcane magic to manipulate the planet's sand. Following a surprise attack where many of his brethren are killed, Kenton must take responsibility to keep the order of Sand Masters alive and discover who betrayed them.

In volume 2, Kenton finds himself trying to negotiate politics with the Day side's rulers while having assassins trying to kill him. He forms a pact with Khriss, who is from the night side of the planet and she is drawn to sand mastery.

In volume 3, Kenton is overwhelmed trying to keep the Sand Masters together. Kenton discovers the truth behind the ambush that killed his father and most of the Sand Masters.

Publication
The first volume in the series was published in June 2016 and reached number two on the graphic novel New York Times Best Seller List. In the 2018 Dragon Awards, volume one won for best graphic novel.

References

2016 comics debuts
2016 graphic novels
American graphic novels
Fantasy graphic novels
Cosmere novels
Works by Brandon Sanderson